A trunkline or trunk line or variation, may refer to:

A natural gas or oil line using pipeline transport
 Trunkline LNG, a liquid natural gas plant in Lake Charles, Louisiana
 Trunkline Pipeline, a pipeline that runs from Texas and Louisiana to Illinois and Indiana
 Trunking trunkline, a main telecommunications link such as a phone line directly connecting exchanges or switchboards at a considerable distance apart
A main transportation link such as:
A main line (railway)
The rail line on Norway Trunk Line
A component of the Michigan State Trunkline Highway System

See also

 
 
 Main line (disambiguation)
 Central line (disambiguation)
 Trunk (disambiguation)
 Line (disambiguation)